Aerolíneas Star Perú S.A. is a Peruvian airline based at Jorge Chávez International Airport in Lima, Peru. It operates both passenger and cargo flights within Peru. The carrier mostly flies domestic routes in Peru from its base in Lima, as well as to Puerto Ayora, in Ecuador.

History
The airline was established on May 1, 1997, as Servicio de Transporte Aéreo Regional by the chief executive, Valentin Kasyanov. Operations were inaugurated with a single Antonov An-32 flying cargo and charter services around South America.
thumb|Star Peru Boeing 737-300

In late 2004, Star Perú began scheduled commercial domestic flights after having acquired a Boeing 737-200. Based on monthly growth of passenger traffic, Star Perú was the fastest-growing airline in Peru in 2005.

In 2017 the Minister of Transport granted Star Peru access to international flights.

In May 2019, Star Perú ended the operation of its BAe 146. For the destinations on which the Boeing 737 cannot land in, 2 Dash 8 Q400s. Star Perú was set to merge with Peruvian Airlines, Star Perú worked very closely with Peruvian Airlines until its close in October 2019.

Destinations
As of 2021, Star Perú operates scheduled and charter routes between the following airports: Star Peru had Rio Branco, Acre as its first international destination in Brazil but that destination has been closed.

Fleet

Current fleet
The Star Perú fleet consists of the following aircraft (as of October 2022):

Former fleet
Star Perú used to fly the following types of aircraft:

See also
 List of airlines of Peru

References

External links

 Official website

Airlines of Peru
Airlines established in 1997
Transport in Lima